Chuck Brown (1936–2012) was an American musician and singer.

Chuck Brown may also refer to:
Chuck Brown (comics artist), American comics writer
Chuck Brown (politician) (1951–2003), American politician
Chucky Brown (born 1968), American basketball player

See also
Charles Brown (disambiguation)